
Lipsko County is a unit of territorial administration and local government (powiat) in Masovian Voivodeship, east-central Poland. It came into being on January 1, 1999, as a result of the Polish local government reforms passed in 1998. The only other town in this county is Solec nad Wisłą.

As of 2019 its total population is 34,028, out of which the population of Lipsko is 5,501 and the rural population is 28,527.

Neighbouring provinces
Lipsko County is bordered by Zwoleń County to the north, Opole Lubelskie County to the east, Opatów County to the south, Ostrowiec County to the south-west, Starachowice County to the west and Radom County to the north-west.

Administrative division
The county is subdivided into six gminas (one urban-rural and five rural). These are listed in the following table, in descending order of population.

References

 
Lipsko